Aechmea strobilacea is a plant species in the genus Aechmea. This species is native to Ecuador, Peru and Panama.

References

strobilacea
Flora of Ecuador
Flora of Peru
Plants described in 1959
Flora of Panama